is a manga by Eiki Eiki first published in Wings and licensed by Digital Manga Publishing.

Reception 
"Train Train is off the wall screwball comedy that is as energetic as it is funny." — Holly Ellingwood, activeAnime.
Leroy Douresseaux gave the first volume a B+ at the Comic Book Bin.
"Train☆Train may not have a dramatic or compelling story line, but the humor is light and sweet, and it does give its intended audience what they want - vignettes centering on their favorite cute guy." — Patricia Beard, Mania.

References

External links 
 
 Train☆Train at Shinshokan

2002 manga
Comedy anime and manga
Digital Manga Publishing titles
Eiki Eiki
Shinshokan manga
Shōjo manga